Me and Simon is the third studio album by Swedish singer-songwriter Laleh, released on 21 January 2009 on Warner Music Sweden records. The album peaked at number two on the Swedish Albums Chart.

First single from the album is the track "Simon Says", followed by "Big City Love" and "Bjurö klubb". The album also contains the track "Snö", soundtrack from the Swedish movie Arn - The Knight Templar which was recorded by Laleh together with the London Symphony Orchestra.
As with her debut album, Laleh keeps her traditional language-mix in her music with having songs in both Swedish and English as well as Persian featured on the album. As well as her two previous albums, she has written and produced all of the songs from the album.

Singles 
 "Simon Says" was released as the lead single from the album on 12 January 2009. The song peaked at number forty-one on the Swedish Singles Chart.
 "Big City Love" was released as the second single from the album on 11 May 2009. The song peaked at number thirty-two on the Swedish Singles Chart.
 "Bjurö klubb" was released as the third single from the album on 10 September 2009.

Track listing 
All lyrics written by Laleh.
 "Big City Love" – 3:40
 "Simon Says" – 3:53
 "Mysteries" – 3:25
 "Go Go" – 3:55
 "Roses" – 4:54
 "The End" – 5:06
 "Nation" – 4:04
 "History" – 1:00
 "Farda" – 4:15 (Tomorrow)
 "Snö" – 4:19 (Snow)
 "Bjurö klubb" – 4:54
 "Svalorna" – 4:30 (The Swallows)
 "Lär mig om" – 2:52 (Teach Me About)

Charts

References 

2009 albums
Laleh (singer) albums